Marewa is a suburb of the city of Napier, in the Hawke's Bay Region of New Zealand's eastern North Island. Development of the suburb began in 1934, after the 1931 Hawke's Bay earthquake raised the previously low lying swamp land.

The suburb includes Marewa Park, a sports ground for soccer, cricket, athletics, marching and bowls, and Kennedy Park Resort, a popular family holiday accommodation provider.

Demographics

Marewa had a population of 5,121 at the 2018 New Zealand census, an increase of 450 people (9.6%) since the 2013 census, and an increase of 507 people (11.0%) since the 2006 census. There were 1,980 households, comprising 2,418 males and 2,700 females, giving a sex ratio of 0.9 males per female, with 1,140 people (22.3%) aged under 15 years, 1,011 (19.7%) aged 15 to 29, 2,214 (43.2%) aged 30 to 64, and 753 (14.7%) aged 65 or older.

Ethnicities were 74.0% European/Pākehā, 33.1% Māori, 4.4% Pacific peoples, 4.2% Asian, and 2.4% other ethnicities. People may identify with more than one ethnicity.

The percentage of people born overseas was 13.6, compared with 27.1% nationally.

Although some people chose not to answer the census's question about religious affiliation, 55.1% had no religion, 28.0% were Christian, 4.3% had Māori religious beliefs, 0.6% were Hindu, 1.1% were Muslim, 1.0% were Buddhist and 2.2% had other religions.

Of those at least 15 years old, 513 (12.9%) people had a bachelor's or higher degree, and 891 (22.4%) people had no formal qualifications. 306 people (7.7%) earned over $70,000 compared to 17.2% nationally. The employment status of those at least 15 was that 1,845 (46.3%) people were employed full-time, 567 (14.2%) were part-time, and 189 (4.7%) were unemployed.

Education

References

Suburbs of Napier, New Zealand